Haymans Island may refer to:

Hayman's Island, Massachusetts, United States
Hayman Island, Queensland, Australia